Qeshlaq (also Romanized as Qeshlāq; also known as Kishlak and Qishlāq) is a village in Qareh Poshtelu-e Bala Rural District, Qareh Poshtelu District, Zanjan County, Zanjan Province, Iran. At the 2006 census, its population was 576, in 135 families.

References 

Populated places in Zanjan County